David Garland (born December 17, 1954) is a singer-songwriter, composer, instrument designer, illustrator, graphic designer, journalist, and former New York city radio personality.

Music projects

A multi-instrumentalist and vocalist, Garland has recorded with Christian Marclay, John Zorn, Shelly Hirsch, Ikue Mori, Sufjan Stevens, Arto Lindsay, Sussan Deyhim, Sean Lennon, Guy Klucevsek, Michael Gira, Karen Mantler, Brian Dewan, and Meredith Monk, among others. He has performed at New York City’s Knitting Factory, The Kitchen, and Carnegie Hall, in Europe, on WNYC’s New Sounds and other venues, and has recorded several albums of his music. In 1993 he released an album, I Guess I Just Wasn’t Made For These Times, which features Garland, along with accompanists Ikue Mori and Cinnie Cole, interpreting songs by Brian Wilson of the Beach Boys. His most recent album, Conversations with the Cinnamon Skeleton, released in 2012, features guest appearances by Vashti Bunyan, and Sean Lennon and Charlotte Kemp Muhl of the band Ghost of a Saber Tooth Tiger.

Radio

Garland hosted the radio show Spinning On Air on station WNYC in New York City for 28 years, and served as the weekend evening host on WQXR, New York City. He continues to produce Spinning On Air as an independent podcast. He hosted two additional programs on WQXR,  Movies On The Radio, which focused on recorded film scores, and Old School, which focused on early music from the 11th to the 18th centuries. Prior to broadcasting at WQXR and WNYC, Garland hosted programs at WKCR, the radio station of Columbia University, New York.

Visual arts

He attended the Rhode Island School of Design from 1972-1976, and graduated with honors.

He has designed album covers for the Improvising Artists record label, and for his own music releases.

Journalism

Garland served as editor, writer, and co-art director for EAR Magazine from 1979 to 1982. He wrote a cover story on composer Philip Glass for the December 1983 issue of Down Beat magazine, and penned liner notes for Brain in a Box: The Science Fiction Collection, issued by Rhino in 2000. He has written a number of pieces for NPR Music, including stories about Van Dyke Parks, Mark David Ashworth, Laura Marling, and Will Stratton, and for the musicians forum Talkhouse

Discography
Albums issued as David Garland
 1987: Control Songs
 1993: I Guess I Just Wasn’t Made For These Times: David Garland Performs Brian Wilson
 1999: Togetherness (Control Songs, Vol. 2)
 2000: My Vortex Camera (Control Songs, Vol. 3)
 2004: The Other Side of the Window
 2006: Reveal
 2007: The Noise in You
 2012: Conversations with the Cinnamon Skeleton
 2018: Verdancy

Albums issued under the band name Garlands (including other family members and outside collaborators)
 2019: Vulneraries Vol. 1
 2019: Vulneraries Vol. 2
 2020: Vulneraries Vol. 3 Mortality
 2020: Vulneraries Vol. 4
 2020: Vulneraries Vol. 5
 2021: Vulneraries Vol. 6

References

External links
 DavidGarland.com — official website

1954 births
Living people
American artists
American male journalists
American male composers
21st-century American composers
American singer-songwriters
American male singer-songwriters
Classical music radio presenters
People from Lexington, Massachusetts
Radio personalities from New York (state)
Rhode Island School of Design alumni
21st-century American male musicians
Rhode Island School of Design alumni in music